This was the first edition of the tournament.

Roman Safiullin won the title after defeating Ben Shelton 6–3, 4–6, 7–5 in the final.

Seeds

Draw

Finals

Top half

Bottom half

References

External links
Main draw
Qualifying draw

Chicago Men's Challenger - 1